Mehdiabad is a settlement and municipality in the Absheron Rayon of Azerbaijan. It has a population of 6,616.

References

Populated places in Absheron District